Narasannapeta is a census town in Srikakulam district of the Indian state of Andhra Pradesh. It is the mandal headquarters of Narasannapeta mandal in Srikakulam revenue division. 43 villages are there under the administrative division of Narasannapeta.

Geography 
It is located 23 km from district capital Srikakulam.

Demographics
Narasannapeta is a Town in district of Srikakulam, Andhra Pradesh. The Narasannapeta Census Town has population of 26,280 of which 12,890 are males while 13,390 are females as per report released by Census India 2011.

Population of Children with age of 0-6 is 2663 which is 10.13% of total population of Narasannapeta (CT). In Narasannapeta Census Town, Female Sex Ratio is of 1039 against state average of 993. Moreover Child Sex Ratio in Narasannapeta is around 937 compared to Andhra Pradesh state average of 939. Literacy rate of Narasannapeta city is 79.05% higher than state average of 67.02%. In Narasannapeta, Male literacy is around 85.86% while female literacy rate is 72.57%.

Narasannapeta Census Town has total administration over 6,530 houses to which it supplies basic amenities like water and sewerage. It is also authorized to build roads within Census Town limits and impose taxes on properties coming under its jurisdiction.

Legislative Assembly 
Narasannapeta is an assembly constituency in Andhra Pradesh.  There are 1,29,078 registered voters in Narasannapeta constituency in 1999 elections.

Politics 

members:' 1951 - H. Satyanarayana Dora
 1967 - S. Jagannadham
 1973 - Baggu Sarojinamma
 1978 - Dola Seeta Ramulu
 1983 and 1985 - Simma Prabhakara Rao
 1989 and 1999 - Dharmana Prasada Rao
 1994 - Baggu Lakshmana Rao
 2004 - Dharmana Krishna Das
 2009 - Dharmana Krishna Das
 2012 - Dharmana Krishna Das (bye poll)
 2014- Baaggu Ramanamurthy.

 Transportation 

National Highway 16 (India) and National Highway 326A (India) Connects Narasannapeta town.

National Highway 326A (India) connects Narasannapeta town with Tilaru, Challavanipeta, Pathapatnam, Paralakhemundi, Mohana in Odisha.

APSRTC BUS CONNECTIVITY :-

Andhra Pradesh State Road Transport Corporation runs Number of busses through this Narasannapeta Bus stand.

It is a major Junction town, where APSRTC Runs buses to Mukhalingam, Pathapatnam, Paralakhemundi, Srikakulam, Kotabommali, Tekkali, Palasa, Pinnintipeta, Amadalavalasa, Polaki, Visakhapatnam, Rajahmundry, Vijayawada, Bhadrachalam, Eluru, Kakinada, Ravulapalem, Razole , Kaikaluru, Machilipatnam.

Nearest Railway Station are Srikakulam Road railway station (CHE), Tilaru railway station (TIU), Urlam railway station (ULM).

 Education 
The primary and secondary school education is imparted by government, aided and private schools, under the School Education Department'' of the state. The medium of instruction followed by different schools are English, Telugu.

References 

Census towns in Andhra Pradesh
Cities and towns in Srikakulam district